The following is a list of political parties in the U.S. State of North Dakota

Current political parties
North Dakota Democratic-NPL Party, state affiliate of the United States Democratic Party
North Dakota Libertarian Party, state affiliate of the Libertarian Party
North Dakota Republican Party, state affiliate of the United States Republican Party

Additionally, the North Dakota Constitution party nominated a candidate in the 2004 presidential election. , it is no longer an organized political party in the state.

Defunct political parties
Democratic (1889 to 1956)
Democratic-Independent (1890 to 1895)
Republican/Non-Partisan League (1915 to 1956)
Republican/Independent Voters Association (1918 to 1945)

Minor political parties

North Dakota election law does not provide for the existence of any minor political parties, and unlike many other states that allow individual independent nominees to include a minor party designation next to their name on the ballot.  A political party is either organized, and thus officially recognized by the Secretary of State's office, with equal rights and responsibilities therein or it does not have any legal existence.

The interest group Friends of Democracy has been lobbying to expand ballot access to the minor political parties, with some success. In 2004, the length of time that a petition to create a new political party could be circulated was expanded, as was the process by which new political parties can remain recognized state parties and independent nominees for president can now include a brief minor party designation in lieu of independent.

North Dakota's most historically significant minor parties, the Non-Partisan League and the Independent Voters Association could be considered factions of the Republican party, however this is a gross simplification of the situation, as both groups had structures strongly resembling independent political parties, despite competing on the Republican primary ticket.

In 1996, the Reform Party became a recognized political party in the state, with Ross Perot winning five percent or more of the popular vote in that state, and the Natural Law Party became organized that year to nominate a slate of candidates in that year's state constitutional election. However, neither political party remained active and soon lost their recognized status.

In 2007, the Libertarian Party and the Constitution Party both received official recognition from the Secretary of State's office as an "organized political party."

In 2007 the Libertarian Party of North Dakota filed a lawsuit in the U.S. District court arguing that state law requiring a minimum number of votes in a party’s primary, for that party to nominate candidates in a legislative election, violated the First and Fourteenth Amendments.

A similar requirement had been struck down in Minnesota and the party hoped that the court would invalidate this law as well.  However, in Libertarian Party of North Dakota v. Jaeger (2011) the Federal Court of Appeals upheld the District court's ruling that the regulation did not impose any unconstitutional burden on the political party.

Unorganized political parties

In 2009, the democratic socialist Liberty Union Party came into existence, although it has not yet run candidates.

See also
Political party strength in North Dakota

References
State government, elections, news resources and political parties

Politics of North Dakota
Political parties in North Dakota
Political parties